Clarence Moore may refer to:
Clarence Moore (American football) (born 1982), American professional football player
Clarence Moore (baseball) (1908–1992), American baseball player
Clarence Moore (businessman) (1865–1912), American businessman and first class passenger on the RMS Titanic
Clarence Bloomfield Moore (1852–1936), American archaeologist
Clarence C. Moore (1904–1979), engineer, inventor, and minister
Clarence Lemuel Elisha Moore (1876–1931), American mathematics professor